Hsieh Che-ching (born 18 November 1973 in Hualien County, Taiwan) is a Taiwanese cultural/art history expert, broadcaster and travel writer.

Hsieh Che-ching was born in Hualien, grew up and studied in Kaohsiung, and now lives in Taipei. He has a BA degree in history and a master's degree from the Department of the History of Art and Archaeology at SOAS. He can speak Chinese, Japanese, English, Italian, and Latin.

Hsieh Che-ching has led mountaineering groups for the tourist industry and has traveled in 86 countries. He has travelled to Everest in the Himalayas, Puncak Jaya in Indonesia, and Mazha Luo Shan in Kenya, east Africa, as well as around the world by ship. His cultural connections include the British Museum, National Gallery in London, and Christie's auction house. Xie's main interest is in cultural history and art history.

His book "Blue Women Reading Letters" in the "European Love Letter" ( <歐遊情書>) was selected as the "Mandarin" text for the fifth grade of the National Primary School and "On the Road to Dreams" for the 2015 Top 100 High School in Taiwan. The book "Banknotes Writing Romance" (鈔寫浪漫) won the Golden Ding Award for excellent publications. He has presided over "UFO Dinner – Xie Zhuangqing Time" and "WTO Sisters", and serves as the host of "Youth Love Reading". The program won the 51st Golden Bell Awards "Best Educational Culture Program Award".

Television and radio broadcasting
 ETTV — "Critical moment", guest
 Azio TV —  "Dongfeng knowledge", host
 UFO Radio — "Green travel the world philosophy", host

References

External links
 謝哲青 page on Facebook
 Video on YouTube
 凱風快晴 — PChome 個人新聞台

1974 births
Living people
People from Hualien County
Alumni of SOAS University of London
21st-century Taiwanese historians
Taiwanese television presenters
Taiwanese radio presenters
21st-century travel writers
Taiwanese travel writers
Cultural historians
Taiwanese art historians